Marinus Wilhelmus Johanna Maria (Rinus) Peijnenburg (29 January 1928, Geldrop – 1 April 1979, Rotterdam) was a Dutch politician.

1928 births
1979 deaths
Members of the House of Representatives (Netherlands)
Ministers without portfolio of the Netherlands
People from Geldrop
Tilburg University alumni
Catholic People's Party politicians
20th-century Dutch politicians
Christian Democratic Appeal politicians
Dutch corporate directors
Dutch trade unionists
Dutch Roman Catholics